Qisda ES900 is a discontinued electronic-book reader developed by Qisda Corporation and based on a Linux platform. The device is sold under various brand names worldwide.

Features 
Qisda ES900 provides a 16 levels of grayscale SiPix touchscreen display for viewing digital content. Pages are turned using the buttons on the device or touchscreen. The ES900 connects to the internet through available Wi-Fi connections.
Users can read books without a wireless connection. Disconnecting the wireless connection can prolong the battery life.

Specifications 

 CPU
 Samsung 2416 ARM9 @ 400 MHz
 OS
 Linux 2.6.21
 Memory
 128 MB (MDDR)
 2 GB (NAND)
 External microSD/microSDHC (up to 16 GB)
 Connectivity
 Wi-Fi b/gOptional: 3.5G HSDPA
 microUSB high speed
 audio jack
 Miscellaneous
 1530 mAh, 3.7 V
 487 gram (without Wi-Fi)
 Reading mode
 > 10.000 pages (Wi-Fi off)

Formats supported 
 Text
 ePUB
 HTML
 PDF
 RTF
 TXT
 Picture
 BMP
 JPEG
 PNG
 Audio
 MP3

Sold as 
The device is sold worldwide under various brand names.
 Asia
 Taiwan: Asus Eee Reader DR900 / TZ900

 Europe
 Asus Eee Reader DR900 / DR950
 bq Avant XL

Modification 
Being that the hardware utilizes Linux-based software it can be changed or improved to the owners content. The firmware is labeled as “QT Software” and varies from vendor to vendor. The upgrade contains multiple image files with the .img extension, along with other system files.

Flashing to upgrade the firmware can be taken advantage of as it does not seem to check if the version that is being installed is older. Due to this, using firmware made by the other vendors on the model each sold in particular is possible.

Dual-boot 
The devices seem to contain a native dual-boot capability. When a device specific key combination is pressed during power-on any linux-kernel + ramdisk combination is booted from the sd-card.

References

External links
Asus Eee Reader DR900
bq Avant XL

Electronic paper technology
Dedicated ebook devices
Linux-based devices